This Horrid Practice: The Myth and Reality of Traditional Maori Cannibalism is a 2008 non-fiction book by New Zealand historian Paul Moon. The book is a comprehensive survey of the history of human cannibalism among the Māori of New Zealand. It was the first published academic survey of Māori cannibalism.

The title of the book is drawn from the 16 January 1770 journal entry of Captain James Cook, who, in describing acts of Māori cannibalism, stated "though stronger evidence of this horrid practice prevailing among the inhabitants of this coast will scarcely be required, we have still stronger to give."

Contents

Post publication 
Shortly after the book appeared, it was featured in numerous news reports and on the New Zealand television programme 60 Minutes. The publication of This Horrid Practice was controversial because of the book's determination that cannibalism was widespread among New Zealand Māori until the mid-19th century. Māori cannibalism is a sensitive topic in New Zealand, and Moon anticipated that the book would be negatively received by some.

The book prompted an anonymous but formal complaint to the New Zealand Human Rights Commission, arguing that it "describes the whole of Maori society as violent and dangerous. This is a clearly racist view claiming a whole ethnic group has these traits."

One of Moon's critics, Margaret Mutu, acknowledged that cannibalism was widespread throughout New Zealand but argued that Moon, as a Pākehā (non-Māori person), "did not understand the history of cannibalism and it was 'very, very hard for a Pakeha to get it right on these things'".

Moon responded by stating that Mutu had "condemned me and announced to the media that I did not understand the history of cannibalism, although she admitted to not having read even a single sentence of the book." Moon also charged his critics with attempted censorship and name-calling. He commented:

What amazes me is that the critics who say I don’t understand the mechanisations of this practice often have not even read the book. Nor do they have evidence to the contrary. While they may not like its content, they can’t deny historical fact. And trying to censor this book is denying the past.

Referring to the book, Dr Rawiri Taonui, New Zealand's first professor of Indigenous Studies, says about the author, "He's looked at no Maori language evidence, nothing from the Māori Land Court. He sets that all aside and makes a giant-sized conclusion about pre-European Maori society that's based on the view of a few Europeans".

References

2008 non-fiction books
Māori culture
Māori society
Māori history
New Zealand non-fiction books
Non-fiction books about cannibalism
Cannibalism in Oceania
Books about New Zealand
Race relations in New Zealand
Penguin Books books
Controversies in New Zealand